An election was held on November 7, 2000 to elect all 100 members to Montana's House of Representatives. The election coincided with elections for other offices, including U.S. President, U.S. Senate, U.S. House of Representatives, Governor and State Senate. The primary election was held on June 6, 2000.

Republicans retained control of the House despite a net loss of one seat, winning 58 seats compared to 42 seats for the Democrats.

Results

Statewide
Statewide results of the 2000 Montana House of Representatives election:

District
Results of the 2000 Montana House of Representatives election by district:

Notes

References

Montana House of Representatives
House of Representatives
2000